The seventh season of One Tree Hill premiered on September 14, 2009. This is the first season not to include the show's original cast members Chad Michael Murray and Hilarie Burton. After successful ratings for the first three episodes, The CW gave the series a full-season order of 22 episodes.

The season premiere was seen by 2.55 million viewers and achieved a 1.2 rating in Adults 18–49. Episode 7 achieved season highs with 2.67 million viewers and a 1.3 rating in Adults 18–49. The season averaged 2.3 million viewers and a 1.1 rating placing it at #118 in the 2009–10 season.

Overview
A year has passed since Lucas and Peyton left Tree Hill. A scandal threatens Nathan's career in the NBA; Haley goes back on the road, but suffers a family tragedy that causes her a very intense battle with depression. Rachel and Dan return to Tree Hill and Brooke hires a new model (Alex) for "Clothes Over Bros" that in turn threatens her relationship with Julian. Mouth and Millicent's relationship is also threatened when Millie decided to become a model, but suffers serious self-image and develops a mini drug problem . Newcomers Clay and Quinn settle in Tree Hill and soon fall for one another, only to have their own personal lives to fix. While old romances, Mia and Chase seem to struggle, new ones form, Miranda and Grubbs, give in and begin a relationship, while Victoria and Alexander decide to take their professional relationship to the next level.

Cast and characters

Regular
 James Lafferty as Nathan Scott (22 episodes)
 Bethany Joy Galeotti as Haley James Scott (22 episodes)
 Sophia Bush as Brooke Davis (22 episodes)
 Austin Nichols as Julian Baker (22 episodes)
 Robert Buckley as Clay Evans (22 episodes)
 Shantel VanSanten as Quinn James (22 episodes)
 Jackson Brundage as Jamie Scott (16 episodes)
 Lee Norris as Mouth McFadden (18 episodes)
 Antwon Tanner as Skills Taylor (11 episodes)
 Lisa Goldstein as Millicent Huxtable (19 episodes)
 Paul Johansson as Dan Scott (13 episodes)
 Jana Kramer as Alex Dupré (20 episodes)

Recurring
 Daphne Zuniga as Victoria Davis (12 episodes)
 India de Beaufort as Miranda Stone (12 episodes)
 Danneel Harris as Rachel Gatina (10 episodes)
 Allison Munn as Lauren (10 episodes)
Michael Grubbs as Grubbs (10 episodes)
Mitch Ryan as Alexander Coin (10 episodes)
 Gregory Harrison as Paul Norris (8 episodes)
 Stephen Colletti as Chase Adams (8 episodes)
 Kate French as Renee Richardson (7 episodes)
 Amanda Schull as Katie Ryan and Sara Evans (7 episodes)
Paul Teal as Avery (7 episodes)
Bradley Evans as Jerry (6 episodes)
Michael May as Chuck Scolnik (6 episodes)
 Scott Holroyd as David Lee Fletcher (6 episodes)

 Kate Voegele as Mia Catalano (5 episodes)
Andrea Moore as Makenna Gage (4 episodes)
 Lindsey McKeon as Taylor James (4 episodes)
 Sasha Jackson as Kylie Frost (4 episodes)
 Bess Armstrong as Lydia James (3 episodes)
Katherine Landry as Madison (3 episodes)
 Cullen Moss as Junk Moretti (3 episodes)
 Vaughn Wilson as Fergie Thompson (3 episodes) 
Jaden Harmon as Andre Fields (2 episodes)
 Joe Manganiello as Owen Morello (1 episode)

Episodes

Production
On February 25, 2009, The CW renewed One Tree Hill for a seventh season. On May 12, 2009, it was confirmed that both Chad Michael Murray and Hilarie Burton would not be returning for the seventh season. On June 8, 2009, it was announced that the seventh season will occur a year into the future from the sixth season finale.

On September 29, 2009 The CW ordered a full season, set to total at 22 episodes.

Cast
This season includes three new characters portrayed by Robert Buckley, Shantel VanSanten, and Jana Kramer. Buckley is featured as Clayton, Nathan's agent and friend. VanSanten is featured as Haley's sister Quinn James. Kramer is featured as Alex, a model for Brooke fashion line, "Clothes Over Bros".

Returning are both Austin Nichols who plays Julian Baker a character introduced in the sixth season and Danneel Harris who had previously portrayed bad girl Rachel Gatina. Nichols has been promoted to a series regular while Harris will be recurring for at least seven episodes, beginning with the second episode of the seventh season. In an interview with new cast member Shantel VanSanten, she had noted the return of Lindsey McKeon as Taylor James, the sister of Haley and Quinn, midway through the season. 

While speaking on the return of Taylor, VanSanten also revealed that her character's mother, played by Bess Armstrong will also return.

Reception
The season averaged 2.28 million viewers and a 1.1 average Adults 18–49 rating placing it at #118 in the 2009–10 season.

DVD release
The DVD release of season seven was released after the season has completed broadcast on television. It has been released in Region 1 and Region 2 and Region 4. As well as every episode from the season, the DVD release features bonus material such as audio commentaries on some episodes from the creator and cast, deleted scenes, gag reels and behind-the-scenes featurettes.

References

http://www.onetreehillweb.net/

External links
Official website

One Tree Hill (TV series) seasons
2009 American television seasons
2010 American television seasons